Deh Now-e Kherabeh (also Romanized as Deh Now-e Kherābeh; also known as Deh Now) is a village in Rivand Rural District, in the Central District of Nishapur County, Razavi Khorasan Province, Iran. At the 2006 census, its population was 1,831, in 425 families.

References 

Populated places in Nishapur County